The Very Best of Dr. Buzzard's Original Savannah Band is a compilation album by Dr. Buzzard's Original Savannah Band, released in 1996 by RCA.  The album includes the group's first two albums, Dr. Buzzard's Original Savannah Band (1976) and Dr. Buzzard's Original Savannah Band Meets King Penett (1978), in their entirety, although the tracks are sequenced differently from the original releases.

Track listing
All tracks written by August Darnell and Stony Browder Jr. unless stated
 "I'll Play the Fool" – 4:47
 "The Gigolo and I" – 4:31
 "Sunshower" – 4:02
 "Hard Times" – 4:09
 "Mister Love" – 4:28
 "Cherchez La Femme/Se Si Bon" – 5:46
 "I'll Always Have a Smile for You" – 2:47
 "An Organ Grinder's Tale" – 4:28
 "You Got Something/Betcha' the Love Bug Bitcha'" – 5:38
 "Transistor Madness/Future D.J." – 4:27
 "Sour and Sweet/Lemon in the Honey" – 6:01
 "We Got It Made/Night and Day" (Darnell, Browder, Cole Porter) – 3:45
 "Nocturnal Interludes" – 3:26
 "Soraya/March of the Nignies" – 4:40
 "Auf Wiedersehen, Darrio" – 4:06

References

Dr. Buzzard's Original Savannah Band albums
1996 greatest hits albums
RCA Records compilation albums